Be Silent, My Sorrow, Be Silent or Still, Sadness, Still is a 1918 Soviet film directed by Pyotr Chardynin, and starring Vera Kholodnaya, Ossip Runitsch, Vitold Polonsky and Vladimir Maksimov. The film is in two parts, but only the first part (44 minutes) survives.

Plot

Paula is a circus performer married to clown-acrobat Lorio. Lorio drinks heavily, and eventually he is critically injured when he performs drunk. The crippled Lorio and Paula are forced to become street musicians.

A group of wealthy young men who had previously seen Paula at the circus  decide to invite the two to perform at their private "bachelor" party, at which Paula is the main attraction.
The young men vie for her attention, give her an expensive necklace and offer Lorio money to turn her over to them. Outraged, Paula leaves and refuses to return to the streets to perform. But when they are truly destitute, she returns to offer herself to one of the gentlemen, the artist Volyntsev.

As Lorio sinks deeper into poverty, Paula enjoys her life as a rich man's mistress – for a while. Her lover becomes too possessive for her taste, and eventually tires of her. When Volyntsev attempts to offer her to a younger rival, Telepnev, Paula leaves him for another young man – Zaritskiy, who is deeply in love with her. Zaritskiy is an inveterate gambler, and playing against Telepnev, he has lost a huge sum of money. Desperate, he devises a plot to steal a cheque he gave to Telepnev. While Paula unwittingly serves as decoy, distracting the party by singing for the guests, her lover sets off the alarm as he attempts to break into the safe. Telepnev doesn't recognise Zaritskiy in the dark room, and shoots him.

Thus concludes the first part. The second part is considered to be lost.

Cast
Vera Kholodnaya – Paula,a circus artiste
Pyotr Chardynin – Lorio,a clown-acrobat
Ossip Runitsch – Zaritskiy, a barrister
Vitold Polonsky – Telepnev, a rich gentleman
Vladimir Maksimov – Volyntsev, an artist
Konstantin Khokhlov – Olekso Presvich, a hypnotist and illusionist
Ivan Khudoleyev – Prakhov, a merchant
 M. Masin – Innokentiy, Prakhov's valet	
 Yanina Mirato – A lady of the demi-monde
 Olga Rakhmanova – Volyntsev's mother

External links

1918 drama films
1918 films
Russian black-and-white films
Russian silent feature films
Russian drama films
Soviet drama films
Soviet black-and-white films
Soviet silent feature films
Silent drama films